Rudolf Weber (born 4 April 1903, date of death unknown) was an Austrian fencer. He competed in the individual and team épée events at the 1936 Summer Olympics.

References

External links
 

1903 births
Year of death missing
Austrian male épée fencers
Olympic fencers of Austria
Fencers at the 1936 Summer Olympics